Peremyotnoye (Peremetnoe; Russian: Перемётное) is a village in far north-western Kazakhstan. It is the administrative center of Bayterek_District in West Kazakhstan Region. Population:

References

Populated places in West Kazakhstan Region